Chassieu is a commune in the Metropolis of Lyon in Auvergne-Rhône-Alpes region in eastern France.

Population

Twin town
Chassieu has been twinned with Coleshill, England, near Birmingham since 1983.

See also
 Eurexpo

References

External links

 Official website 

Communes of Lyon Metropolis
Dauphiné